Ministry of Finance is ministry of Bhutan is responsible to steer and sustain a robust economy through a dynamic fiscal policy and strong culture of fiscal discipline.

Departments 
The Ministry of Finance is responsible for:
Department of Macroeconomic Affairs
Department of National Budget  
Department of National Properties  
Department of Public Accounts  
Department of Revenue and Customs

Ministers 
Lyonpo Chogyal (20 May 1968 – 1988)
Lyonpo Dorji Tshering (1988 – 1998)
Lyonpo Yeshey Zimba (August 1998 – July 2003)
Lyonpo Wangdi Norbu (July 2003 – July 2007) (April 2008 – May 2013)
Lyonpo Namgay Dorji (July 2013 - 2018)
Lyonpo Namgay Tshering (7 November 2018 - ...)
Source:

References

Finance
Bhutan
Economy of Bhutan
1968 establishments in Bhutan